Travis Shallow (born Travis Leigh Shallow; July 31, 1984) is an American singer-songwriter, musician, and recording artist.

He is best known for his steady solo career, with the single "Hard Time With The Truth" released on Pearly Girl Records March 31st, 2023. "Hard Time With The Truth" follows the release of "Let It Pass" that was released on Cavity Search Records.

Shallow said "I wrote Let It Pass last year and recorded it in late January (2020) right before the quarantine and COVID thing got into full swing here in the states. I was watching a friend of mine going through a divorce and it was hard on her, and I could see her trying to hold onto to something that was already long gone, and she was holding onto more of the idea of how it used to be instead of how it actually was. It’s like holding onto an electric fence waiting for it to stop hurting you, when all you have to do is let go. I’ve had to keep learning this lesson over and over, so I’m singing it to myself just as much as documenting her story too."

Shallow debuted "Let It Pass" on his livestream series "Live from Shallow Chateau" that he created during quarantine in response to all live shows being cancelled due to the pandemic. He has live-streamed over 125 episodes during quarantine since March 2020. The "Live from Shallow Chateau" livestream series was also broadcast on JamBase as one of their weekly Featured Livestreams.

Shallow also live-streamed on Breedlove Guitars social media during November 2020 as Shallow followed Jeff Bridges as their Featured Artist of the month. Shallow initially became an endorsed artist with Breedlove Guitars in January 2019.

Shallow was also a former member of alternative country band A Few Good Liars, with whom he recorded one studio album in 2011 titled, Battered Wooden Body. "That album showcases the harmony vocal power of the group and Shallow sings songs that can be tender and those that traffic in darkness. In all he does so with restraint, whether on country tinged acoustic ballads (the excellent "Amen") or aching confession-drenched numbers"  "Battered Wooden Body" was recorded in Oxford, Mississippi at Tweed Recording Studio and was engineered by Andrew Ratcliffe whose discography includes (Will Hoge, The Damnwells, American Aquarium)

In 2012, Shallow left A Few Good Liars and started writing and recording songs that would later be released as his first solo self-titled album, Travis Shallow, to regional critical acclaim in the southeastern United States.

Shallow went back to Tweed Recording Studio with Andrew Ratcliffe engineering to record his solo debut album. This solo album was acoustically driven with an accompanying band to highlight the songwriting and lyrical prowess. "Shallow is a singer whose vocal personality is ultimately a category unto itself, like a Willie Nelson, an Otis Redding. He could sing anything and make it sound great, make it well worth listening to. His self-titled album has seven songs like that." Shallow's solo album has a maturity to it that catapulted Shallow into bigger rooms and a wider audience.

After the release of his self-titled album in March 2016, Shallow took the show to the people performing intimate shows, stripped down with him and an acoustic guitar. Shallow also landed himself some national opening spots after releasing his debut solo album with legend Gregg Allman from The Allman Brothers, Tedeschi Trucks Band, Lukas Nelson & Promise of the Real (son of legend Willie Nelson), The Marcus King Band, Jerry Joseph, Todd Snider, and fellow native North Carolina band, American Aquarium.

Shallow continued writing and began fronting a new line-up, Travis Shallow & The Deep End, with a studio album titled, The Great Divide, released on October 31, 2017. This 8-song album is a mix of Americana, soul, and rock and roll, recorded analog to two-inch tape at Overdub Lane in Durham, North Carolina with Jason Merritt engineering.

The Great Divide was featured in Relix Magazine upon release. "Emerging from NC- Travis Shallow & The Deep End dive into The Great Divide with their eyes wide open. Their debut release seamlessly weaves genres, adding a touch of surprise, yet staying hauntingly familiar. Shallow is a musician’s musician, and his new release, The Great Divide, is your window in."

Shallow has been compared vocally to Kris Kristofferson on a couple of choice ballad tracks from The Great Divide. "THE GREAT DIVIDE: A whole host of memories of my time in the south-land (mostly in Huntsville, Alabama & lower Tennessee) are stirred up by Travis’s superbly crafted songs and guitar work… he has a voice that (somehow) reminds me of another of my Americana heroes, Kris Kristofferson… as you listen to his extraordinary lyrics & vocal work on the soul-filled “River That Sings“, you’ll realize why I say that…"

Members 
Travis Shallow & The Deep End

 Travis Shallow - vocals, guitar
 Bob Russell - guitar
 Jason Moore - bass
 Brian Mason - drums

Discography 
 Battered Wooden Body (2011)
 Travis Shallow (2016, Pearly Girl Records)
 The Great Divide (2017, Pearly Girl Records)
 Let It Pass (2020, Cavity Search Records)

References

External links 
Travis Shallow Official Website
Travis Shallow YouTube Channel
Travis Shallow iTunes link

Official Video Performances
"Live from Shallow Chateau - All Episodes"
 "Let It Pass - (Live)"
 "The Great Divide - Live from Low Tide Studio"
 "Not There Yet - (Live)"
 "Drive-In Concert - Wilmington, NC (Live)"
 "One Day - (Live)"
 "Pinocchio - Live from Low Tide Studio"
"Live to Love the Silence - by Travis Shallow"

1984 births
Living people
People from Wilmington, North Carolina
American alternative country singers
American rock singers
American country singer-songwriters
21st-century American singers
Country musicians from North Carolina
Singer-songwriters from North Carolina